List of Mount Everest death statistics is a list of statistics about death on Mount Everest.

Youngest people to die on Mount Everest
Examples of known cases

Rahul Panchal (Ghabus), April 25, 2015, 19
Ang Chuldim, August 31, 1982, 20
Lobsang Sherpa, May 7, 2013, 22
Víctor Hugo Trujillo, August 16, 1986, 22
Michael Matthews, May 13, 1999, 22
Andrew Irvine, June 9, 1924, 22
Marco Siffredi, September 8, 2002, 23
Himanshu Kapoor, April 25, 2015, 29

Named corpses

"The German Woman", Hannelore Schmatz
"Green Boots", possibly Tsewang Paljor
"Sleeping Beauty", Francys Arsentiev

Medical and scientific professionals who died on Everest
See also Dr. Beck Weathers, a medical doctor who is famous for narrowly surviving the 1996 Everest Disaster.

Dr. A. M. Kellas (1921, en route to Everest as part of expedition)
Dr. Karl G. Henize (1993), PhD in Astronomy
Dr. Sándor Gárdos (2001), Hungarian team doctor, specialist of high altitude medicine 
Dr. Nils Antezana (2004), Pathologist
Dr. Robert Milne (2005), Software Engineer
Dr. Peter Kinloch (2010)
Dr. Eberhard Schaaf (2012), German doctor who died in high altitude
Dr. Charles MacAdams (2016)
Dr. Maria Strydom (2016)
Dr. Roland Yearwood (2017), a medical doctor in Alabama (USA)

Died on descent after summiting

Examples of those who, after summiting, died on the descent down or soon after (not counting other climbs, on the same expedition but does not have to be their first summit)

examples only
Dimitar Ilievski-Murato
Francys Arsentiev
Hannelore Schmatz
Hristo Prodanov
Jozef Psotka
Lobsang Tshering
Marco Siffredi
Pasang Lhamu Sherpa
Ray Genet
Shoko Ota (2004)
Shriya Shah-Klorfine (2012)
Tomas Olsson
Vitor Negrete
Yasuko Namba
Matthew Edward Ball

Deadliest events at Everest
The history of mountaineering expeditions on Mount Everest has evolved since the first official mountaineering expedition trekked up its slopes in 1921. In subsequent decades up to the 1960s, many expeditions were funded by major organizations like the Joint Himalayan Committee and launched in a "siege" style with large climbing parties; although the 1935 and 1938 expeditions were small and low-cost as preferred by Eric Shipton and Bill Tilman.

These early campaigns helped overcome the relatively remote nature and uncharted territory of Everest. These journeys also paved the way for the "lightweight"-style small expeditions that followed. A prime example is the successful 1978 ascent by Reinhold Messner and Peter Habeler, the first without bottled oxygen, and followed by a 1980 solo ascent (also without bottled oxygen) by Messner.

The 80s and 90s saw the emergence and rise in the commercialization of the ascent to Everest's summit. These commercial expeditions range from logistics only (i.e. a permit and some basic base camp supplies) to expensive, professionally guided expeditions promising even laypeople an increased chance of successfully reaching the summit. The increased access now afforded to scaling the world's tallest mountain, while leading to more people successfully reaching the summit than ever before, has also seen a concomitant and exponential rise in casualties. There can be delays of two hours or more in the queue to reach the top (in the Death Zone), with a photo taken on May 22, 2019, showing a queue of about 220 climbers headed there. 

Another very deadly event was in 1995, when 42 died near Everest in a large avalanche.

Deaths by nationality 

*with at least two deaths

Cause of death

Astronaut fatality

One of the people claimed by Everest mountaineering was the U.S. astronaut Karl Gordon Henize. He was on a mission to study radiation but came down with a fatal case of HAPE in October 1993 and died at north base camp. At the time he was the oldest astronaut to have flown in space and also had a doctorate in astronomy. He died on October 5, 1993, and was buried on Mount Everest.

See also
 2014 Nepal snowstorm disaster
 The Himalayan Database
 List of deaths on eight-thousanders
 List of Mount Everest records
 List of people who died climbing Mount Everest
 Mount Hood climbing accidents

References

Accidents
Deaths on Mount Everest
Mount Everest
Mountaineering deaths
Mountaineering disasters
Climbing and mountaineering-related lists